Nabire Regency is one of the regencies (kabupaten) in the Indonesian province of Central Papua. It covers an area of 12,010.65 km2, and had a population of 129,893 at the 2010 Census and 169,136 at the 2020 Census, comprising 87,688 males and 81,448 females. The official estimate as at mid 2021 was 170,914. The administrative centre is the town of Nabire, which faces onto Cenderawasih Bay.

Administrative Districts
In 2010 Nabire Regency comprised fourteen districts (distrik), but a fifteenth district - Moora Islands (Kepulauan Moora) - has been added since 2010 by the splitting of Napan District. The districts are tabulated below with their areas and their populations at the 2010 Census and the 2020 Census, together with the official estimates as at mid 2021. The table also includes the location of the district administrative centres, the number of administrative villages (rural desa and urban kelurahan) in each district, and its postal codes.

Note: (a) includes Anggrameos Island in Cenderawasih Bay. (b) at the time of the 2010 Census, the Moora Islands were included in Napan District, but the figures have been separated in this table. (c) comprises the villages (desa) of Arui (25.18 km2, with 201 inhabitants in 2020), Hariti (2.62 km2, 288 inhabitants in 2020), Kama (5.71 km2, 283 inhabitants in 2020), Mambor (3.51 km2, 552 inhabitants in 2020) and Moor (4.67 km2, 259 inhabitants in 2020).

References

External links
Statistics publications from Statistics Indonesia (BPS)

Regencies of Central Papua